Nad Odrą was a district of the city of Szczecin, Poland, that functioned from 1954 to 1976.

History 
Nad Odrą was established on 7 October 1954, as one of four district of the city of Szczecin, Poland. The other three districts were: Dąbie, Pogodno, Śródmieście. It bordered Dąbie to the west, Pogodno to the west, and Śródmieście to the north. In 1961, it was inhabited by 33 992 people. It existed until 19 November 1976, when the district were abolished.

The city was again divided into districts in 1990. The former area of Nad Odrą, was divided between Północ, and Śródmieście.

Subdivisions 
The district was subdivided into 8 administrative neighbourhoods.

Notes

References 

Nad Odra
Nad Odra
Nad Odra
Nad Odra
Nad Odra